Trinity in Black is the first compilation box set by German power metal band Powerwolf. It consists of the first three albums, Return in Bloodred, Lupus Dei and Bible of the Beast, on black vinyl with a bonus 10" EP (EP in Bloodred) on red vinyl. The box set was limited to a run of 500, and included an exclusive A2 poster, an 8-page full-sized booklet, a hand-numbered collector's certificate and an exclusive woven patch.

Track listing

LP 1 (Return in Bloodred)

LP 2 (Lupus Dei)

LP 3 (Bible of the Beast)

EP in Bloodred 

 "Midnight Messiah" is included on the EP because it was not present on the Bible of the Beast LP.

Personnel 
 Attila Dorn – vocals
 Matthew Greywolf – lead and rhythm guitar
 Charles Greywolf – bass, rhythm guitar
 Stéfane Funèbre – drums, percussion
 Falk Maria Schlegel – organ, keyboards

References 

2011 compilation albums
Powerwolf albums